Wilson Isidor (born 27 August 2000) is a French professional footballer who plays as a forward for Russian Premier League club Lokomotiv Moscow.

Club career
On 11 November 2018, Isidor made his professional debut with Monaco in a 4–0 Ligue 1 loss to Paris Saint-Germain. He subsequently had loan spells in Championnat National with Laval in the 2019–20 season and Bastia-Borgo in the 2020–21 season. In his time at Bastia-Borgo he was named Championnat National revelation of the season.

On 22 January 2022, he signed a 4.5-year contract with Russian club Lokomotiv Moscow. He scored at least once in each of his first 6 games in the Russian Premier League, repeating the record for most consecutive games with a goal at the start of the league career that was set a week prior to Isidor's sixth game by Yusuf Yazıcı. He was selected player of the month for April 2022 by the Russian Premier League.

On 30 January 2023, Lyon announced that Isidor failed their medical test due to persistent knee pain, which canceled his loan move to the club.

International career
Born in France, Isidor is of Haitian descent. He is a youth international for France.

Career statistics

References

External links
AS Monaco Profile
France profile at FFF

2000 births
Footballers from Rennes
Black French sportspeople
French sportspeople of Haitian descent
Living people
French footballers
France youth international footballers
Association football forwards
Stade Rennais F.C. players
AS Monaco FC players
Stade Lavallois players
FC Bastia-Borgo players
FC Lokomotiv Moscow players
Ligue 1 players
Championnat National players
Championnat National 2 players
Championnat National 3 players
Russian Premier League players
French expatriate footballers
Expatriate footballers in Russia
French expatriate sportspeople in Russia